La Femme Trombone (The Trombone Woman) is the sixth studio album by Les Rita Mitsouko.

Track listing

External links
La Femme Trombone release history

References

2002 albums
Virgin Records albums
Les Rita Mitsouko albums